Oxfordshire County Cricket Club, in its current form, was formed in 1921.  The county first competed in the Minor Counties Championship in 1895 and 1896.  They then appeared again from 1900 to 1906, before competing continuously from 1922.  They have appeared in twenty-seven List A matches, making six Gillette Cup, sixteen NatWest Trophy and five Cheltenham & Gloucester Trophy appearances.  The players in this list have all played at least one List A match.  Oxfordshire cricketers who have not represented the county in List A cricket are excluded from the list.

Players are listed in order of appearance, where players made their debut in the same match, they are ordered by batting order.  Players in bold have played first-class cricket.

Key

List of players

List A captains

References

Oxfordshire County Cricket Club
Oxfordshire
Cricketers